This is a list of Australian television programs which first aired in 2011. The list is arranged chronological order. Where more than one program debuted on the same date, those programs are listed alphabetically.

Premieres

Free-to-air television

Subscription television

References

2011 in Australian television
Premieres